Silvia Fröhlich ( Arndt, born 24 February 1959) is a German rower who won a gold medal in the coxed fours at the 1980 Summer Olympics. She also won two gold and three silver medals at the world championships of 1978–1983, most of them with Marita Sandig. After retiring from competitions, she worked as a dentist.

She competed at the 1978 World Championships under her maiden name and competed under her married name a year later in Bled.

References 

1959 births
Living people
Sportspeople from Leipzig
People from Bezirk Leipzig
East German female rowers
Sportspeople from Saxony
Olympic rowers of East Germany
Rowers at the 1980 Summer Olympics
Olympic gold medalists for East Germany
Olympic medalists in rowing
Medalists at the 1980 Summer Olympics
World Rowing Championships medalists for East Germany
Recipients of the Patriotic Order of Merit in silver